Margaux Nicole Jeanne Aude Fabre (born 2 October 1992) is a French swimmer. She competed in the women's 4 × 200 metre freestyle relay event at the 2016 Summer Olympics. Fabre also competed in lifesaving at the 2017 World Games, winning two medals.

References

External links
 

1992 births
Living people
French female freestyle swimmers
Olympic swimmers of France
Swimmers at the 2016 Summer Olympics
European Aquatics Championships medalists in swimming
World Games gold medalists
World Games bronze medalists
Sportspeople from Perpignan
Competitors at the 2017 World Games
Swimmers at the 2020 Summer Olympics
20th-century French women
21st-century French women